Derry Mining Site Camp was a mining site camp near Leadville, Colorado that operated during 1916–1923.  It was listed on the National Register of Historic Places in 2000.  The listing included eight contributing buildings and one contributing site.

It is close to the Hayden Ranch Headquarters, which is also National Register-listed.

See also
National Register of Historic Places listings in Lake County, Colorado

References

External links
 

History Colorado
Historic districts on the National Register of Historic Places in Colorado
National Register of Historic Places in Lake County, Colorado